"How We Went to Mars" is a humorous short story by British writer Arthur C. Clarke. It was first published in March 1938, in the third and final issue of Amateur Science Stories maganize. It follows a group of British rocket scientists who travel to Mars and their interactions with Martian society. It was awarded the 1939 Retro Hugo at Loncon 3 in 2014.

The short story was published in Czech in the collection Direction of Time (Polaris, 2002) translated by Petr Caha.

References

External links 
 

Short stories by Arthur C. Clarke
1938 short stories
Fiction set in 1952
Short stories set on Mars
Works originally published in Amateur Science Stories